Matanzas (Cuban ) is the capital of the Cuban province of Matanzas.

Matanzas is called the City of Bridges, for the seventeen bridges that cross the three rivers that traverse the city (Rio Yumuri, San Juan, and Canimar). For this reason it was referred to as the "Venice of Cuba." It was also called "La Atenas de Cuba" ("The Athens of Cuba") for its poets.

Matanzas is known as the birthplace of the music and dance traditions danzón and rumba.

History

Matanzas was founded in 1693  as San Carlos y San Severino de Matanzas.  This followed a royal decree ("real cédula") issued on September 25, 1690, which decreed that the bay and port of Matanzas be settled by 30 families from the Canary Islands.

Matanzas was one of the regions that saw intensive development of sugar plantations during the colonial era. Consequently, many African slaves were imported to support the sugar industry, particularly during the first half of the nineteenth century. For example, in 1792 there were 1900 slaves in Matanzas, roughly 30% of its population. In 1817, the slave population of Matanzas had grown to 10,773, comprising nearly 50% of the overall population. By 1841, 53,331 slaves made up 62.7% of the population of Matanzas. Census figures for 1859 put the Matanzas slave population at 104,519. Matanzas was the site of several slave insurrections and plots, including the infamous Escalera conspiracy (discovered in late 1843). Due to the high number of both slaves and, importantly, free Afro-Cubans in Matanzas, the retention of African traditions is especially strong there. In 1898, Matanzas became the location of the first action in the Spanish–American War. The city was bombarded by American Navy vessels on April 25, 1898, just after the beginning of the war.

Name origin
The name Matanzas means "massacre" and refers to a putative slaughter in 1510 at the port of the same name, in which 30 Spanish soldiers tried to cross one of the rivers to attack an aboriginal camp on the far shore. The Spanish soldiers had no boats, so they enlisted the help of native fishermen. However, once they reached the middle of the river, the fishermen flipped the boats, and due to the Spanish soldiers' heavy metal armor, most of them drowned. Only two women—one said to be the beautiful María de Estrada—survived, the result of being taken by a Cacique. De Estrada is said to have later escaped the "power of the Cacique" and married Pedro Sánchez Farfán in the city of Trinidad.  According to municipal historian Arnaldo Jimenez de la Cal, "[i]t was the first act of rebellion of natives in Cuba."

Geography

The city is located on the north shore of the island of Cuba, on all three sides of the Bay of Matanzas. The bay cuts deep in the island, and three rivers flow in the bay inside city limits (Rio Yumuri, San Juan, and Canimar). To the south-east, the landscape rises into a hill called Pan de Matanzas, divided from the Atlantic coast by the Yumuri Valley and a coastal ridge.

The city of Matanzas is divided into four neighborhoods: Versalles, Matanzas, Playa and Pueblo Nuevo. The municipality is divided into the barrios of Bachicha, Bailén, Barracones, Bellamar, Camarioca, Cárcel, Ceiba Mocha, Colón, Corral Nuevo, Guanábana, Ojo de Agua, Refugio, San Luis, San Severino, Simpson y Monserrate, Versalles and Yumurí.

Demographics
In 2004, the municipality of Matanzas had a population of 143,706.

Transportation

Air
Matanzas is served by Juan Gualberto Gómez Airport, 15 km east of the city.

Rail

The city has two railway stations. The main station is on the main line from Havana to Santiago de Cuba. The electrified Hershey train operates by a different route to Havana from a separate station in the barrio of Versalles.

Buses
Matanzas is also served by Viazul and Astro buses.

Tramway
After two failed attempts Matanzas had a tramway in 1916 (initially as Ferrocarril Eléctrico de Matanzas, then as city owned  Compañía de Servicios Públicos de Matanzas in 1918 and Compañía de Tranvías de Matanzas in 1926). In 1952 it acquired tramcars from Havana Electric Railway, but converted with buses by new owners Omnibus Urbanos SA in 1954.

Roads
The Via Blanca highway connects the city with both Havana in the west and Varadero in the east.

Education
The University of Matanzas is the province's high learning education institution.

Attractions

 Pharmaceutical Museum - established in 1882
 Museo Historico Provincial de Matanzas - Provincial History Museum
 El Consejo Provincial de Artes Visuales at the Galería Pedro Esquerré, shows exhibitions of contemporary art.
 Sauto Theater - Teatro Sauto - Opened in 1863, the theatre hosts plays, opera, ballet, and symphonic concerts. It is a National Monument of Cuba.
 Catedral San Carlos De Borromeo
 Nearby Bellamar caves, also a National Monument of Cuba.
 Boating on the Canimar River
 Matanzas bridges
 Casino Español - Now being restored (May 2008).
 Matanzas High School (Palm Coast)
 Necropolis de San Carlos Borromeo
 Quinta de Bellamar, heritage house and church

Monuments 
The Aqueduct of Matanzas, today a national monument, was built in 1870 and is still providing the city with water from the spring Manantial de Bello. An ingenious construction built 1912 exploited and till 1912 by Fernando Heydrich and Company.

Notable people
Eufemio Abreu - Negro league baseball player
Bernardo Benes - exiled Cuban born lawyer, banker and civic leader in Miami
Maria Magdalena Campos-Pons - Afro-Cuban Artist-photography, performance, audiovisual media, and sculpture, born in Matanzas in 1959
José Cardenal - Former Major League Baseball player
Jesus Cabrera - Leading Cuban Pathologist was born in Matanzas in 1929
Leo Cárdenas - Former Major League Baseball player and 5-time All-Star was born in Matanzas in 1938
Rafael Cruz - Born in Matanzas in 1939; Evangelistic preacher and father of U.S. Senator Ted Cruz
Guillermo Heredia - Major League Baseball player
Felipe de Jesús Estévez - Bishop of the Diocese of Saint Augustine
William R. King - 13th Vice President of the United States, was sworn into office near Matanzas in 1853
Carlos Lamar - Olympic fencer was born in Matanzas in 1908
Héctor Lombard - Mixed martial artist, born in Matanzas in 1978
Sonora Matancera - is a Cuban/Afro-Cuban band
 Joseph Marion Hernández (1788 – 1857), Floridano who served as the first delegate from the Florida Territory. He was also the first Hispanic American to serve in the United States Congress and a member of the Whig Party (1822 – 1823)
Richard Maurice - Film director and union organizer, born in Matanzas in 1893
Monguito - was a Cuban vocalist, bandleader, producer and composer
Nestor Pérez - former professional baseball player and the current manager of the Augusta GreenJackets
Israel Pickens - third governor of the US state of Alabama, died in Matanzas in 1827
Pérez Prado - Mambo bandleader and composer was born in Matanzas.
Javier Sotomayor - High Jump current World Record Holder, 8'1/2" in 1993, and Olympic Champion, Barcelona, Spain, 1992.
Anne Kingsbury Wollstonecraft - botanist, naturalist, botanical illustrator, and women's rights advocate, lived in Matanzas in the 1820s.
Lyen Wong - Cuban-German fitness athlete was born in Matanzas in 1974
Joseph White - Franco-Afro-Cuban violin virtuoso was born in Matanzas on New Year's Eve 1835 (He died in Paris in 1918)

See also
List of cities in Cuba

References

Further reading

 Miguel A. Bretos. Matanzas: The Cuba Nobody Knows (University Press of Florida; 2010) 317 pages; combines scholarly and personal perspectives in a history of Matanzas, a city that was known as the "Athens of Cuba" during a sugar boom of the 19th century.

External links

 Ciudad de Matanzas —A website with much information in Spanish about the city of Matanzas, from its foundation to the present day 
 Ciudad de Matanzas—City of Matanzas 
 Portal de la Ciencia en Matanzas 

 
1690s establishments in the Caribbean
1690s in Cuba
1693 establishments in the Spanish West Indies
17th-century establishments in Cuba
Cities in Cuba
Populated places established in 1693
Populated places in Matanzas Province